The 2011 Austin Peay Governors football team represented Austin Peay State University in the 2011 NCAA Division I FCS football season. The Governors were led by fifth-year head coach Rick Christophel and played their home games at Governors Stadium. They are a member of the Ohio Valley Conference. They finished the season 3–8, 2–6 in OVC play to finish in a tie for seventh place.

Schedule

References

Austin Peay
Austin Peay Governors football seasons
Austin Peay Governors football